Jim Pugh and Blaine Willenborg were the defending champions, but Willenborg did not participate this year.  Pugh partnered Rick Leach

Leach and Pugh won the title, defeating Alberto Mancini and Christian Miniussi 7–6, 6–1 in the final.

Seeds
All seeds receive a bye into the second round.

Draw

Finals

Top half

Bottom half

External links
 Draw

1988 BMW Open